Felsővadász is a village in Borsod-Abaúj-Zemplén county, Hungary.

Geography 
Felsővadász village is located in the valley between Kupa and Gadna. The closest towns are Szikszó (18 km), Edelény and Encs (kb. 30 km).

History 
The name Felsővadász means "Upper-hunter," because this location given to the royal hunters together with Alsóvadász - "lower-hunter". The first mention was in 1279. The Rákóczi family bought the village in 1517. The Turkish army attacked and burned the castle in 1567. In 1860, a windstorm ruined the wooden Greek Catholic Church, so a new church was erected in 1864.

Notable people 
The family castle of George II Rákóczi is in this village what appears in the lower part of the coat of arms.

References

External links 
 Street map 
 HUngarian Catolic Lexicon: Felsővadász
 Szeposzag.hu: Felsővadász  webpage about attractions ofFelsővadász

Populated places in Borsod-Abaúj-Zemplén County